Nikolay Iliev (born 31 March 1964) is a Bulgarian former professional footballer who played as a defender. He was part of the Bulgarian national team that reached the semi-finals of the 1994 World Cup. Iliev's spent most of his career with Levski Sofia, managing 196 appearances and 25 goals in the A PFG as well as participating in 19 matches and netting 2 goals in European tournaments. He also had a spell with Bologna in Serie A in the late 1980s and early 1990s, becoming the first Bulgarian footballer to ply his trade in the top Italian league.

International goals 
Scores and results list Bulgaria's goal tally first, score column indicates score after each Iliev goal.

Honours

Club
Levski Sofia
 Champion of Bulgaria: 1984, 1985, 1988, 1993
 Bulgarian Cup: 1982, 1984, 1986, 1992
 Cup of the Soviet Army: 1984, 1987, 1988

International
Bulgaria
FIFA World Cup: fourth place 1994

Individual
 Bulgarian Footballer of the Year: 1987

References

External links
 
 Profile at LevskiSofia.info

1964 births
Living people
Footballers from Sofia
Bulgarian footballers
Association football defenders
Bulgaria international footballers
PFC Levski Sofia players
Hertha BSC players
Stade Rennais F.C. players
Bologna F.C. 1909 players
First Professional Football League (Bulgaria) players
Serie A players
2. Bundesliga players
1994 FIFA World Cup players
Bulgarian expatriate footballers
Bulgarian expatriate sportspeople in Italy
Expatriate footballers in Italy
Bulgarian expatriate sportspeople in Germany
Expatriate footballers in Germany
Bulgarian expatriate sportspeople in France
Expatriate footballers in France